Napoleon Einstein (born 16 August 1989) is an Indian cricketer. He is a right-handed opening batsman.  He played in the Indian Premier League for the Chennai Super Kings.

Einstein made his List A debut for Tamil Nadu against Kerala in a Ranji One-Day Trophy match at Secunderabad in February 2007.  Opening the batting, he scored 92, putting on 203 for the first wicket with Murali Vijay to set up a 46-run win.
A month later, he played against Assam in the same competition but this time made only 1.

He has been batting, and bowling off spinners in under-19 tournaments and has been selected for the Indian team for the under-19 World cup to be held in Malaysia in Feb 2008. India went on to win the under-19 world cup.

References

External links

Indian cricketers
Tamil Nadu cricketers
1989 births
Living people
Chennai Super Kings cricketers
Cricketers from Chennai